Samuel Desjardins (July 25, 1852 – December 4, 1924) was a Canadian politician.

Born in Ste-Thérèse, Canada East, the son of Samuel Desjardins and Sophie Laurier, Desjardins was educated at the College of Ste-Thérèse de Blainville. A physician, He was first elected to the House of Commons of Canada for the electoral district of Terrebonne in a 1903 by-election held to fill the vacancy caused by Raymond Préfontaine choosing to sit for the riding of Maisonneuve, after having been elected in the two constituencies. A Liberal, he was re-elected at the general elections of 1904 and was defeated in 1908.

Electoral record

References
 
 The Canadian Parliament; biographical sketches and photo-engravures of the senators and members of the House of Commons of Canada. Being the tenth Parliament, elected November 3, 1904

1852 births
1924 deaths
Liberal Party of Canada MPs
Members of the House of Commons of Canada from Quebec